The Dark Horse Nebula or Great Dark Horse (sometimes called the Prancing Horse) is a large dark nebula that, from Earth's perspective, obscures part of the upper central bulge of the Milky Way. The Dark Horse lies in the equatorial constellation Ophiuchus (the Serpent Bearer), near its borders with the more famous constellations Scorpius and Sagittarius. It is a large, visible feature of the Milky Way's Great Rift, uniting several individually catalogued dark nebulae, including the Pipe Nebula. It is visible from Earth only on clear moonless nights without light pollution and with low humidity.

Name
This region of dark nebulae is called Dark Horse because it resembles the side silhouette of a horse and appears dark as compared with the background glow of stars and star clouds.  It is also known as "Great" because it is one of the largest (in apparent size) groups of dark nebulae in the sky.

Nearby nebulae
The rear of the Great Dark Horse (its rump and hind legs), is also known as the Pipe Nebula, which itself carries the designation B77, B78, and B59. (The 'B' numbers reference entries in the Barnard Catalogue of dark nebulae.) The Snake Nebula (B72) is by comparison a small S-shaped nebula emerging from the west side of the northern part of the bowl of the Pipe (B77).

Barnard 68 is another named dark patch of molecular gas and dust appearing in the Dark Horse Nebula.

See also
 Coalsack Nebula
 Great Rift (astronomy)

References

Dark Horse Nebula
Ophiuchus (constellation)